Beggar on a Beach of Gold is the fourth album by Mike + the Mechanics, released on 6 March 1995. This album contained three UK hits, the No.12 hit "Over My Shoulder", the No.33 hit "A Beggar on a Beach of Gold", and the No.51 hit "Another Cup of Coffee". All three songs charted in Germany as well, and "Another Cup of Coffee" was also popular in Russia; "Over My Shoulder" was particularly successful in France, reaching No.9. The album was certified Gold by the BPI for sales of 100,000 copies. Adrian Lee performed on this album as a session musician following his departure from the band, and this was drummer Peter Van Hooke's last album as an official member of the band as he left the band shortly after the album's release.

Track listing

Personnel 
Mike + The Mechanics
 Mike Rutherford – keyboards, electric and acoustic guitars, bass guitar, backing vocals
 Paul Carrack – lead vocals (2, 3, 5, 7, 8, 11, 12), keyboards, backing vocals 
 Paul Young – lead vocals (1, 3, 4, 6, 9, 10, 13), electric rhythm guitar, backing vocals 
 Peter Van Hooke – drums

Additional personnel
 Adrian Lee – keyboards
 B. A. Robertson – keyboards
 Paul "Wix" Wickens – keyboards
 Dale Newman – programming
 Clem Clempson – electric rhythm guitar, electric guitar
 Gary Wallis – drums
 David Frangioni – drum loop programming  (3)
 Rich Mendelson – drum loop programming  (3)
 Andy Newmark – drums (12)
 Pete Beachill – brass arrangements (13)
 Katie Kissoon – backing vocals (5)
 Tessa Niles – backing vocals (5)

Production 
 Mike Rutherford – producer 
 Christopher Neil – producer 
 Paul Gomersall – engineer (1, 2, 4–11, 13)
 Nick Davis – remixing (1), recording (3, 12), mixing (3, 12)
 Mark Robinson – assistant engineer 
 Bob Ludwig – mastering at Gateway Mastering (Portland, ME).
 Mike Bowen – technical assistance 
 Geoff Callingham – technical assistance
 Hills Archer Ink. – artwork 
 David Scheinmann – photography

Charts

Weekly charts

Year-end charts

Certifications

References

Mike + The Mechanics albums
1995 albums
Albums produced by Mike Rutherford
Albums produced by Christopher Neil